Skyline High School (SHS) is a public high school in Oakland, California, United States. It is part of the Oakland Unified School District.

Administration and academics

For the 2014-2015 school year, the principal was Vinh Trinh and the assistant principals were Marisol Arkin, Anya Gurholdt, Elin Peinado and Christina Macalino.

In July 2015, it was announced that Trinh was resigning. The interim principal as of August 2015 is Claude Jenkins. For the 2015-2016 school year, the assistant principals were Vinnie Blye, Emiliano Figueroa, Gary Middleton and Nikki Seaberg. The 2017-18 school year will see Nancy Bloom as the head principal, with Dr. Christina Macalino serving as the 9th Grade Atlas/Small Learning Communities principal.

Skyline High School students get assigned an Atlas "House" in 9th grade, A cohort to prepare for their 10th grade year, where they will choose a Linked Learning Pathway. Pathways are "schools within a school" centered on career fields. Ninth grade students apply to the pathway of their choice in the spring semester. Students study with the same team of teachers and group of students from 10th to 12th grades in their English/social studies and many other courses. The pathways include Computer Science & Technology, Community Health & Education,  Green Energy, and Visual & Performing Arts (VAPA). Depending on the academy of choice, Students can take advantage of internships and paid summer jobs in their fields.

Location
Skyline High School is located on a  campus at the crest of the Oakland hills. The school is near the Redwood Regional Park and has a panoramic view of the San Francisco Bay Area. The school is located in a residential neighborhood away from commercial venues.

The Atlas Freshman House
In 2009, Skyline launched Atlas, a program for freshmen. In the Atlas system, each ninth grader is placed in a team named after a mythological figure represented by Skyline's mascot, the Titan. Atlas is the Titan who carries the heavens on his shoulders, so giving his name to the freshman house symbolizes a commitment to building a strong foundation for a new Skyline. Each ninth grader shares the same four teachers for Math, Social Studies, English, and Science. This provides teachers with a greater opportunity to intercommunicate about the students' social and academic development. Freshmen can take an "Advisory" period during which they receive lessons in academic and career planning, study skills, interpersonal development and citizenship. With each teacher serving as an advisor for 25 students, the Atlas system allows for greater connection between teachers, students, and families. As one teacher stated, "No one falls through the cracks."

Demographics
Skyline High School's first graduating class was the Class of 1962. At that time, the student body was predominantly White. The school's demographics have changed over the years. In 2020-2021 Skyline had over 1800 students with an approximate demographic distribution of:

 37.6% Hispanic American
 27.7% African American
 14.4% Asian American
 11.1% White
 7.0% mixed race
 1.7% Native Hawaiian or Pacific Islanders
 0.4% Native American

Notable alumni

Entertainment
 Del the Funky Homosapien – rapper of the group Hieroglyphics
 Brely Evans – actress, singer and comedian
 Tom Hanks – Hollywood actor and two-time Academy Award-winner
 John Landgraf - President of FX and television producer
 Sunspot Jonz – founder of Mystik Journeymen and Living Legends
 Kathreen Khavari – actress, writer and producer
 Ledisi (Ledisi Anibade Young) – soul/R&B and jazz singer, songwriter and actress
 Nnegest Likké – Hollywood writer and director of Phat Girlz
 LaToya London – American Idol semifinalist, season 3
 Goapele Mohlabane – soul/R&B singer and songwriter
 Carlos Ramirez – creator of the Trollface
 E.C. Scott – electric blues singer, songwriter and record producer
 DJ Toure – member of Hieroglyphics collective, record producer, DJ and drummer
 Aaron Woolfolk – film director, screenwriter

Athletics
 C. W. Anderson – wrestler on Extreme Championship Wrestling
 Davone Bess – NFL wide receiver
 Will Blackwell – former NFL wide receiver for Pittsburgh Steelers; head coach of Skyline Football
 Theotis Brown – NFL running back for the St. Louis Cardinals, the Seattle Seahawks, and the Kansas City Chiefs
 Yonus Davis – CFL running back for the BC Lions
 Greg Foster – former NBA player
 Derrick Gardner – football player
 Dwight Garner – NFL football player
 Marcus Jensen – former Major League Baseball catcher and gold medalist in the 2000 Summer Olympics in Sydney
 Brian Johnson – former Major League Baseball catcher
 Bill Lester – Class of 1979, Grand-Am Rolex Sports Car Series and NASCAR Craftsman Truck Series driver
 Gary Payton – former NBA point guard for the Seattle Supersonics
 Bip Roberts (Leon Joseph Roberts) – former Major League Baseball All-Star second baseman
 Kevin Smith – former NFL tight end for the Oakland Raiders and Green Bay Packers
 Marvel Smith – NFL offensive linesman for the Pittsburgh Steelers
 Roy Sommer – NHL center for the Edmonton Oilers
 Deon Strother – NFL and CFL player
 Frank Summers – NFL fullback for the Pittsburgh Steelers
 Peter Thibeaux – former NBA player for the Golden State Warriors
Kwame Vaughn (born 1990), American basketball player for Maccabi Haifa in the Israeli Basketball National League
 Gerris Wilkinson – NFL linebacker for the New York Giants

Miscellaneous
 Amazon Eve – model and actress
 Haben Girma – deafblind lawyer
 Paul F. Lorence – captain, U.S. Air Force; killed in action over Gulf of Sidra, Operation Eldorado Canyon, April 14–15, 1986
 Favianna Rodriguez – artist and activist
 Libby Schaaf – politician and current Mayor of Oakland

See also
 List of Oakland, California high schools

References

External links
 https://www.ousd.org/skyline
 Link to 2006-2007 Accountability Progress Reporting

High schools in Oakland, California
Educational institutions established in 1959
Public high schools in California
1959 establishments in California
Oakland Unified School District